Robot Galaxy was a mall-based retail and entertainment company that allowed children to build their own personalized robots. The Robot Galaxy brand included retail stores, an online virtual world, and a comic book series.

History
Robot Galaxy was founded in 2007 by entrepreneur Oliver Mitchell and former retail executive Ken Pilot . The first two stores opened October 2007; one in the Palisades Center in West Nyack, NY and the other in the Freehold Raceway Mall in Freehold, NJ. In November 2008, Robot Galaxy opened a store within Toys R Us Times Square .

Retail
The store experience allowed children to customize their own personal robots. Children began by picking a character from the comic book series and then choose from a variety of different motorized parts and accessories to construct a unique robot. Considering the number of robot parts to choose from, there were over a thousand possible robots.

Once activated, the robots have a USB connection that allowed robot owners to plug their robots into their computers, connecting to the Robot Galaxy virtual world.

Online virtual world
The online virtual world provided a safe community for children to play games and battle with other robots. By playing games and collecting points, children can unlock new features on their robots.

Comic book series
There are currently four comic books with more expected to become available in September 2009. The comic books explain the story of the Robot Galaxy, and include all robots available for sale in stores.

References

 The Vindicator - Google News Archive Search

External links
 

Retail companies of the United States
Toy companies of the United States
Robotics companies of the United States
American companies established in 2007